Coonamessett Airport was an airfield operational in the mid-20th century in Hatchville, Massachusetts. It is now part of the Pheasant Area at the Frances A. Crane Wildlife Management Area.

References

1933 establishments in Massachusetts
1968 disestablishments in Massachusetts
Airports disestablished in 1968
Airports established in 1933
Airports in Barnstable County, Massachusetts
Falmouth, Massachusetts
Defunct airports in Massachusetts